The Sumulong Highway, constructed in 1960, is the highway in the Philippines that connects Marikina with Antipolo and the municipality of Cainta in the province of Rizal. It was named after Don Juan Sumulong, an Antipolo native who served as the country's senator and founder of the Democrata Party.

Since 2014, with the implementation of the new route numbering system by the Department of Public Works and Highways (DPWH), it is a component of National Route 59 (N59) of the highway in the Philippine highway network from its intersection with Marcos Highway at Masinag Junction to Sen. L. Sumulong Memorial Circle, the road's endpoint at the city proper, both in Antipolo.

The highway continues A. Bonifacio Avenue past J.P. Rizal Street at the city proper of Marikina. It then proceeds eastwards, eventually entering the province of Rizal at Cainta. It enters Antipolo, where it veers south to meet the Marcos Highway (Marikina-Infanta Highway) at the Masinag Junction. It then traverses the mountaineous terrain until it meets its terminus at Senator Lorenzo Sumulong Memorial Circle, where it is continued by J.P. Rizal Street towards the city proper of Antipolo. It is sometimes referred in media as the "killer highway"  due to the number of accidents that have occurred on it, most especially the area between Sitio Maligaya and Mambugan Barangay Hall. The highway's segment between the provincial boundary of Rizal and Don Celso S. Tuason Avenue in Antipolo is also officially known as Marikina-Victoria Valley-Antipolo Road.

References

Roads in Metro Manila
Roads in Rizal